John Lennon (1940–1980) was an English rock musician who gained worldwide fame as one of the members of the Beatles.

Lennon may also refer to:
Lennon (name), a given name and surname (and list of people with the name)
Lennon (album), a 1990 CD box set featuring John Lennon's solo songs
Lennon (musical), a 2005 Broadway musical about the life of John Lennon
Lennon, Finistère, a commune in France
Lennon, Michigan, a village in the United States
4147 Lennon, a main-belt asteroid
Lennon, a river near Kilmacrennan, Ireland
Lennon (Brazilian footballer) (born 1991), born Lennon Eduardo Carvalho Celestino, Brazilian footballer

See also
Lenin (disambiguation)